Vitaly Daraselia (born 27 September 1978), or Vitali Daraselia Jr., is a retired Georgian footballer.

Daraselia Jr. is the son of Vitaly Daraselia, also a footballer.

Daraselia started his career at Dinamo Batumi before cross border for CSKA Kyiv. He was signed by Georgian giant Dinamo Tbilisi after poor season in Kyiv.

In February 2004, he was spotted by Alania Vladikavkaz and played for 2 seasons.  In 2005–06 season he returned to Dinamo Tbilisi before left for Shakhter Karagandy in August 2006.

In January 2007 Daraselia returned to Georgia again, for Sioni Bolnisi.

At 2007–08 season he played for Dacia Chişinău before signed by Lokomotivi Tbilisi.

International career
Daraselia received his first call-up in 2002.

Honours

Individual 
CIS Cup top goalscorer: 2004

References

External links

1978 births
Living people
Footballers from Georgia (country)
Expatriate footballers from Georgia (country)
Georgia (country) international footballers
FC Arsenal Kyiv players
FC CSKA Kyiv players
FC Systema-Boreks Borodianka players
FC Sioni Bolnisi players
FC Dacia Chișinău players
FC Lokomotivi Tbilisi players
FC Dinamo Tbilisi players
FC Spartak Vladikavkaz players
FC Shakhter Karagandy players
FC Dinamo Batumi players
Russian Premier League players
Ukrainian Premier League players
Kazakhstan Premier League players
Expatriate footballers in Ukraine
Expatriate footballers in Russia
Expatriate footballers in Kazakhstan
Expatriate footballers in Moldova
Expatriate sportspeople from Georgia (country) in Ukraine
Expatriate sportspeople from Georgia (country) in Moldova
Expatriate sportspeople from Georgia (country) in Russia
Expatriate sportspeople from Georgia (country) in Kazakhstan
Association football midfielders